Tupiza Airport is a very high elevation airport  northeast of Tupiza, a city in the Potosí Department of Bolivia.

See also

Transport in Bolivia
List of airports in Bolivia

References

External links 
OpenStreetMap - Tupiza
OurAirports - Baures
Fallingrain - Tupiza Airport

Airports in Potosí Department